The Range Busters is a 1940 American Western film directed by S. Roy Luby and written by John Rathmell. The film is the first in Monogram Pictures' "Range Busters" series, and it stars Ray "Crash" Corrigan as Crash, John "Dusty" King as Dusty and Max "Alibi" Terhune as Alibi, with Luana Walters, LeRoy Mason and Earle Hodgins. It was released on August 22, 1940.

The "Range Busters" series ran from 1940 to 1943 and encompassed 24 films, with the first 16 starring Corrigan, King and Terhune.

Plot
The Circle T Ranch is terrorized by a series of murders, culminating in the death of the ranch owner, Homer Thorp. His daughter, Carol, is being pressured into selling the ranch by the villainous Torrence. The three Range Busters—Crash, Dusty and Alibi—ride into town and save Carol from the bully. She offers them a job on the ranch, and they learn from Carol's friend Doc Stengle that the ranch is cursed, haunted by a Phantom. Torrence's gang of gunrunners are hiding in an abandoned mine on the property, and the Range Busters are kept busy rounding up the gang and discovering the true identity of the mysterious Phantom.

Cast
 Ray "Crash" Corrigan as "Crash" Corrigan
 John "Dusty" King as "Dusty" King
 Max "Alibi" Terhune as "Alibi" Terhune
 Luana Walters as Carol Thorp
 LeRoy Mason as Torrence
 Earle Hodgins as Uncle Rolf
 Frank LaRue as Doc Stengle
 Kermit Maynard as Wyoming
 Bruce King as Wall
 Carl Mathews as Henchman Rocky
 Horace Murphy as Homer Thorp

Reception
Hal Erickson wrote on Allmovie.com, "The initial entry was as much a whodunit as a western, with the heroic triumvirate trying to ascertain the identity of The Phantom, a mysterious murderer. The revelation of the culprit will be a surprise to anyone who hasn't caught on to the clues planted in Reel One. Boasting good performances and well-chosen, unfamiliar outdoor locations, The Range Busters was an auspicious start to one of Monogram's most lucrative series."

See also
The Range Busters series:

 The Range Busters (1940)
 Trailing Double Trouble (1940)
 West of Pinto Basin (1940)
 Trail of the Silver Spurs (1941)
 The Kid's Last Ride (1941)
 Tumbledown Ranch in Arizona (1941)
 Wrangler's Roost (1941)
 Fugitive Valley (1941)
 Saddle Mountain Roundup (1941)
 Tonto Basin Outlaws (1941)
 Underground Rustlers (1941)
 Thunder River Feud (1942)
 Rock River Renegades (1942)
 Boot Hill Bandits (1942)
 Texas Trouble Shooters (1942)
 Arizona Stage Coach (1942)
 Texas to Bataan (1942)
 Trail Riders (1942)
 Two Fisted Justice (1943)
 Haunted Ranch (1943)
 Land of Hunted Men (1943)
 Cowboy Commandos (1943)
 Black Market Rustlers (1943)
 Bullets and Saddles (1943)

References

External links
 

1940 films
1940s English-language films
American Western (genre) films
1940 Western (genre) films
Monogram Pictures films
Films directed by S. Roy Luby
Range Busters
1940s American films